The 1961 Washington Redskins season was the team's 30th in the National Football League. The team tried to improve on their 1–9–2 record from 1960.  However, under their first-year coach Bill McPeak, their 1-12-1 performance during the season placed the Redskins in last-place in the NFL Eastern Conference.  Their lone victory of the season came in the final game of the season at home against the Dallas Cowboys, 34–24. The 1961 campaign remains the worst season record in Redskins history.

This season was also the first one in their new stadium, D.C. Stadium, later renamed RFK Stadium.

Offseason

NFL Draft

Regular season

Schedule

Standings

References

Washington
Washington Redskins seasons
Washing